John William Flannagan Jr. (February 20, 1885 – April 27, 1955) was an American politician of the Democratic Party. He represented Virginia in the United States House of Representatives from 1931 - 1949.  The John W Flannagan Dam is named after him.

Early life and career
Flannagan born on a farm near Trevilians, in Louisa County, Virginia.  He earned a law degree from Washington and Lee University in 1907 and was admitted to the bar the same year.  He practiced law for several years, before becoming the Commonwealth's attorney for Buchanan County, Virginia in 1916 and 1917.  After that, Flanagan continued the practice of law, but also engaged in banking from 1917 to 1930.

Politics and later life
Flannagan was subsequently elected as a Democrat to the 72nd Congress and to the eight succeeding Congresses (March 4, 1931 – January 3, 1949).  He was the chairman of  Committee on Agriculture (Seventy-eighth and Seventy-ninth Congresses), and the congressional adviser to the first session of the Food and Agriculture Organization of the United Nations at Quebec in 1945.  Flanagan was not a candidate for renomination in 1948, and he resumed the practice of law in Bristol, Virginia until his death there April 27, 1955.  He is interred in Mountain View Cemetery.

References

1885 births
1955 deaths
Democratic Party members of the United States House of Representatives from Virginia
People from Louisa County, Virginia
People from Buchanan County, Virginia
People from Bristol, Virginia
Washington and Lee University alumni
County and city Commonwealth's Attorneys in Virginia
20th-century American lawyers